The tiny cisticola (Cisticola nana) is a species of bird in the family Cisticolidae.
It is found in Ethiopia, Kenya, Somalia, South Sudan, and Tanzania.
Its natural habitats are dry savanna, subtropical or tropical dry shrubland, and subtropical or tropical dry lowland grassland.

References

 BirdLife International 2004.  Cisticola nanus.   2006 IUCN Red List of Threatened Species.   Downloaded on 25 July 2007.

tiny cisticola
Birds of East Africa
tiny cisticola
Taxonomy articles created by Polbot